Darold A. Treffert (March 12, 1933 – December 14, 2020) was a psychiatrist and research director who specialized in the epidemiology of autism spectrum disorders and savant syndrome. He lived in Fond du Lac, Wisconsin. He was on the staff at Agnesian HealthCare and served on the Board of Trustees of Marian University. Treffert was a clinical professor at the University of Wisconsin Medical School. He was also a clinical professor at University of Wisconsin–Milwaukee.

Education 
Treffert first attended Bethany Lutheran College where he focused on pre-medical courses and earned an associate in arts degree in 1953. He received his medical doctorate in 1958 from the University of Wisconsin Medical School. He interned in Eugene, Oregon, and then completed a residency in psychiatry at University Hospitals (now University of Wisconsin Hospital and Clinics) in Madison, Wisconsin.

Career 

In 1976, he held positions in the private practice of psychiatry, was executive director of the Fond du Lac County Health Care Center and the medical director of the Alcoholism Rehabilitation Unit of St. Agnes Hospital in Fond du Lac. From 1979 to 1980, Treffert was president of the State Medical Society of Wisconsin and from 1981 to 1987 was chair of its board of directors. He has also been the president of the Wisconsin Psychiatric Association and the American Association of Psychiatric Administrators. In 1995, he was appointed to the Wisconsin Medical Examining Board and, in January 2002, was elected its chair.

Treffert maintained a website on autism, savant syndrome, and related conditions hosted by the Wisconsin Medical Society. He held a research director position at the Treffert Center, Agnesian HealthCare in Fond du Lac, Wisconsin.

Treffert died unexpectedly at his home in Fond du Lac on December 14, 2020.

Recognition 
He received awards from the Wisconsin Mental Health Association, the Office of Alcoholism and Drug Abuse of Wisconsin, and the Wisconsin Association for Marriage and Family Therapy.

Appearances 
Treffert has made appearances on 60 Minutes, CBS Evening News, The Phil Donahue Show, Discovery Channel, Larry King Live, the Newshour, The Oprah Winfrey Show, Today, and in a number of documentaries.

Publications 
Treffert has written articles in Scientific American and MIND. His books include:

 Extraordinary People: Understanding Savant Syndrome, iUniverse.com, 2000. 
 Islands of Genius: The Bountiful Mind of the Autistic, Acquired, and Sudden Savant. Jessica Kingsley Publishers, 2010.

See also 
Historical figures sometimes considered autistic

References

External links 

 Darold Treffert website
 Savant Syndrome at Wisconsin Medical Society
 

American psychiatrists
People from Fond du Lac, Wisconsin
Writers from Wisconsin
University of Wisconsin–Madison faculty
Physicians from Wisconsin
2020 deaths
1933 births
University of Wisconsin School of Medicine and Public Health alumni
Bethany Lutheran College alumni